Nicholas or Nick Hawkins may refer to:

Nick Hawkins (politician) (born 1957), MP for Blackpool South and Surrey Heath
Nicholas Hawkins (MP) (fl. 1597), MP for Cardiff Boroughs
Nicholas Hawkins (priest) (died 1534), English cleric and diplomat
Nick Hawkins (musician) (1965–2005), guitarist